1170 Siva, provisional designation , is a stony Phocaea asteroid and large Mars-crosser from the innermost regions of the asteroid belt, approximately 10 kilometers in diameter. It was discovered on 29 September 1930, by Belgian astronomer Eugène Delporte at Uccle Observatory in Belgium, and later named after the Hindu deity Shiva.

Orbit and classification 

Siva is a Mars-crossing asteroid, as it crosses the orbit of Mars at 1.666 AU. It is also a member of the Phocaea family. It orbits the Sun at a distance of 1.6–3.0 AU once every 3 years and 7 months (1,296 days). Its orbit has an eccentricity of 0.30 and an inclination of 22° with respect to the ecliptic. Siva was first observed at the Japanese Kwasan Observatory, 3 days prior to is discovery. The body's observation arc begins at Uccle, two weeks after its official discovery observation.

Naming 

This minor planet is named after Shiva, a Hindu deity often depicted with a third eye on his forehead and with a snake around his neck. Naming citation was first mentioned in The Names of the Minor Planets by Paul Herget in 1955.

Physical characteristics 

In the Tholen taxonomy, Siva is a stony S-type asteroid.

Rotation period 

Only fragmentary lightcurves of Siva have been obtained since 2001. They gave a rotation period between 3.5 and 5.22 hours with a small change in brightness of 0.04 to 0.1 magnitude. As of 2017, no secure period has been published.

Diameter and albedo 

According to the surveys carried out by the Infrared Astronomical Satellite IRAS, the Japanese Akari satellite, and NASA's Wide-field Infrared Survey Explorer with its subsequent NEOWISE mission, Siva measures between 7.68 and 12.13 kilometers in diameter, and its surface has an albedo between 0.128 and 0.40. The Collaborative Asteroid Lightcurve Link adopts the results obtained by IRAS, that is, an albedo of 0.1751 and a diameter of 10.37 kilometers with an absolute magnitude of 12.43. Siva belongs to the brightest known Mars-crossers.

Notes

References

External links 
 Asteroid Lightcurve Database (LCDB), query form (info )
 Dictionary of Minor Planet Names, Google books
 Asteroids and comets rotation curves, CdR – Observatoire de Genève, Raoul Behrend
 Discovery Circumstances: Numbered Minor Planets (1)-(5000) – Minor Planet Center
 
 

 

001170
001170
Discoveries by Eugène Joseph Delporte
Named minor planets
001170
19300929